Naimakka is Sweden's northernmost weather station and a small settlement in Kiruna Municipality, Norrbotten County with one permanent inhabitant as of 2018, who has been mentioned in several media articles.

Naimakka is right on the water boundary between Sweden and Finland and is located close to Finnish settlement of Ropinsalmi.

The settlement has very few dwellings and is only accessible by hiking across the Könkämäeno river's ice sheet in winter or by boat in summer. The E8 highway goes adjacent to the river on the Finnish side.

Naimakka has midnight sun approximately in between 24 May and 21 July, with polar night (as in the sun being below 0.0° sun angle for 24 hours) in between 2 December and 11 January, although it has got about five hours of twilight during that period.

Climate

Naimakka has a continental subarctic climate (Köppen climate classification Dfc), with cold and long winters. Summers are short, but can get occasional temperatures in the higher 20's celsius, although  has never been recorded. The warmest ever temperature was set on 18 July 2018. Due to its lower elevation in a valley, summers are warm enough to permit the growing of trees, although the higher elevations in the mountain it sits beneath is made up of tundra.

The local climate is comparatively less severe compared to most other locations at 68°N, although it is also a lot colder than coastal locations in Northern Norway that have strong influences from the North Atlantic Current, an influence weakening farther inland. As a result of the landmass and absence of cool waters in summer, Naimakka is briefly warmer than those locations during July only.

Naimakka's weather station used to be located on Finnish soil on the other easier accessible side of the river. This was before an automated station was set up on the Swedish side in 1995. Both stations, although in different jurisdictions, count as one record in Naimakka's historical data.

Due to Naimakka's high latitude, combined with being inland and elevated, it is one of Sweden's and also the European Union's coldest station locations. It is also sizeably colder than Karesuando in spite of the relative proximity.

References

Lapland (Sweden)
Populated places in Kiruna Municipality